Canadian Musician is a Canadian magazine that is published bi-monthly by Norris-Whitney Communications Inc.

History and profile
Canadian Musician was launched by Jim Norris in Toronto in 1979. The premier issue was published in March/April 1979. The magazine's primary area of interest is to profile Canadian musicians and musical events. The magazine also writes articles on the Canadian music business and features articles on musical equipment and technology. The magazine covers a broad spectrum of artists from a variety of musical genres. It is distributed internationally through subscription and across music and record stores and newsstands in Canada. The headquarters is in Niagara Falls, Ontario.

In 1991 the circulation of Canadian Musician was about 27,001 copies. As of 2023, Matt Bauer serves as the editor of the magazine.

References

External links
Official website of Canadian Musician

1979 establishments in Ontario
Bi-monthly magazines published in Canada
Music magazines published in Canada
Magazines established in 1979
Magazines published in Ontario
Mass media in Niagara Falls, Ontario
Magazines published in Toronto